The Harold Porter National Botanical Garden covers almost 200 ha between mountain and sea, in the heart of the Cape Fynbos region within the Kogelberg Biosphere Reserve to the east of Cape Town, South Africa, specifically near Betty's Bay along Clarence Drive (R44). With about 1,600 plant species, the area contains a floral diversity per unit area that is greater than anywhere else in the world. The Garden consists of 10 hectares of cultivated gardens and 190.5 hectares of pristine natural fynbos. In addition, 60 species of birds can be found there, as well as porcupines, genets, skunks, hyraxes, baboons, and snakes. Foot trails reach cliffs, ravines, heaths, forests, streams, and mountain pools.

In 1939, Harold Nixon Porter, Jack Clarence, and Arthur Youldon, purchased the land between Rooi-Els and the Palmiet River. After Porter's death, the land was passed to the South African National Biodiversity Institute (SANBI). The local municipality later added adjacent land to the garden.

In 2022, the garden was expanded by 1.15 ha after the addition of a neighbouring erf, purchased in 2018 by the World Wide Fund for Nature South Africa (WWF-SA). In 2019 the WWF-SA entered into a 99-year management agreement with SANBI.

Gallery

See also 
List of botanical gardens in South Africa

References

External links 

 South African National Biodiversity Institute
 Harold Porter National Botanical Garden Homepage
 www.kbrc.org.za

 

Botanical gardens in South Africa